Double Down (original titled Zigs) is a 2001 American drama film directed by Mars Callahan, and starring Jason Priestley, Peter Dobson and Richard Portnow. It received an R rating by the MPAA.

Plot
Four young compulsive gamblers waste their lives on booze, broads and bookies. David (Jason Priestley), the heavy-drinking ladies man. Mike (Kane Picoy), a degenerate gambler. Cory the Jersey Jinx (Peter Dobson). Brett (Justin Jon Ross), the guy who tells every girl he loves her on the first date. When they find themselves in debt to a psychotic Christopher Walken obsessed hit man (Mars Callahan) they come up with a radical plan to get out of debt with a fixed game.

References

External links 

 

2001 films
2001 crime drama films
2000s thriller films
American crime drama films
American thriller films
Films about gambling
Trimark Pictures films
2000s English-language films
Films directed by Mars Callahan
2000s American films